KGVO may refer to:

KGVO (AM), a radio station (1290 AM) licensed to serve Missoula, Montana, United States
KFGM-FM, a radio station (101.5 FM) licensed to serve Frenchtown, Montana, which held the call sign KGVO-FM from 2012 to 2016